Archery at the 2010 Summer Youth Olympics was held over a three-day period from 19 August to 21 August. The events took place at the Kallang Field in Singapore.

Qualification
Special qualifying competition at 2009 YWC and 5 continental qualification tournaments were held in 2009 and 2010. 17 places at YWC allocated to NOCs of highest ranked archers. 6 places distributed during continental events to NOCs not yet qualified (2 places for Europe and 1 place each for Asia, Americas, Africa and Oceania).

Qualified athletes

Junior Boys' individual

Entry list:

Junior Girls' individual

Entry list:

Competition schedule

Medal summary

Medal table

Events

References

 Schedule

External links

Archery Event at 2010 Summer Youth Olympics

 
2010 Summer Youth Olympics events
Youth Summer Olympics
2010
International archery competitions hosted by Singapore
Kallang